Jennifer Watson (born 1951) is an Australian artist known for her paintings that combine text and images.

Biography 
Jenny Watson was born in Melbourne in 1951 and she lives and works in Samford, Queensland. Her formative years as an artist were in the 1970s in Melbourne and London. In 1972, she completed a Diploma of Painting at the National Gallery of Victoria Art School, Melbourne. In 1973, she completed a Diploma of Education at the State College of Victoria.  She had her first solo show in 1973.

Early influences on her practice include conceptual art, feminism and the punk scene in London and Melbourne. Uniquely, her work takes these influences into the domain of figurative painting. She has developed her own visual language that frequently combines text with images. She currently mentors at Queensland College of Art, Griffith University.

Career 
Watson came to prominence in Australia during the 1980s, a period in Australian art history when the relationship between word and image, painting and photography, and art and popular culture were important themes. Her work is part of this investigation of ideas about visual representation that characterised conceptualism and critical postmodernism. Both conceptualism and critical postmodernism stress distancing from the subject matter they represent, whether through deadpan presentation of material or an ironic tone, in contrast Watson's practice frequently suggests an intimate or personal approach to her material.

Watson said of her approach: “I quickly realised that being a serious woman artist was not unusual, and with that possibility established, it allowed me to develop the work more radically, away from figuration towards philosophical, conceptual practice, and ultimately towards my own autobiographical take.”

Watson's work has been described as confessional by art historian Benedikt Stegmayer thereby positioning her work alongside the work of younger artists such as Tracey Emin. In Watson's work it is unclear whether the paintings are autobiographical or not.

In 1993, she represented Australia at the 45th Venice Biennale. In 2017 a major survey of her work was shown at the Museum of Contemporary Art in Sydney and Heide Museum of Modern Art, Melbourne.

Works 
 Selected Solo Exhibitions 
 2017: Jenny Watson, The Fabric of Fantasy, Museum of Contemporary Art, Sydney, Australia  
 2016: Jenny Watson, Chronicles, Griffith University Art Gallery, Brisbane, Australia   
 2016: Just a Girl, Roslyn Oxley9 Gallery, Sydney, Australia  
 2015: Fabrications, Anna Schwartz Gallery, Melbourne, Australia  
 2014 Garden of Eden and Child's Play, Galerie Transit, Belgium
 
Selected Group Exhibitions 
2016: Painting, More Painting-Chapter 2, Australian Centre for Contemporary Art, Melbourne, Australia 
2015: Redlands Konica Minolta Art Prize, National Art School, Sydney, Australia  
2014: Solitaire, Tarrawarra Museum of Art, Healesville, Victoria, Australia    
2013: Mix Tape 1980s: Appropriation, Subculture, Critical Style, National Gallery of Victoria, Melbourne, Australia  
2012: Contemporary Australia: Women, Gallery of Modern Art, Brisbane, Australia.  
2002: Fieldwork: Australian Art 1968 - 2002, National Gallery of Victoria, Federation Square, Melbourne, Australia

References

Further reading 
 Judy Annear, ‘Jenny Watson; painter of the mirror,’ MCA Collection Volume One, (Sydney: MCA, 2012) pp. 432–440.
 Julie Ewington, ‘Think big, and be loud - Three Generations of Australian Female Artists,’ Art & Australia, 49, No.3, 2012, pp. 448-455
 Paul Taylor, ‘Jenny Watson’s Modernism,’ Art International, January/February, 1981.

External links 

 
 

Australian women artists
1951 births
Living people
Australian contemporary artists